Bethlehem Baptist Church or variants thereof may refer to:

 Bethlehem Baptist Church (Phoenix, Arizona), listed on the NRHP in Maricopa County, Arizona
 Bethlehem Missionary Baptist Church (Florida)
 Bethlehem Baptist Church (Minneapolis), Minneapolis, Minnesota
 Bethlehem Baptist Church (Barnwell, South Carolina), listed on the NRHP in Barnwell, South Carolina
 Bethlehem Baptist Church (Los Angeles), listed Los Angeles Historic-Cultural Monument
 Bethlehem Baptist Church (Brooksville, Florida)